Chris Löfvén (born 4 April 1948) is an Australian film maker.  He is best known for directing the feature film Oz (1976) and for directing a number of video clips, including "Eagle Rock".

He started making films when he was about 12.

He worked in Noosa community radio.

Select filmography
 The Tunnel (1963) p short
 Part One - 806 (1969–71)
 Part Two - The Beginning (1971) - short (soundtrack/score by Lindsay Bourke)
 Cruisin''' (1973–74) - short
 Oz - A Rock 'n' Roll Road Movie'' (1976) - feature

References

External links
 Chris Lofven at BFI
 Chris Lofven at Screen Australia
 Chris Lofven at IMDb
 Bio at Inner Sense

1948 births
Living people
Australian film directors